Konrad Bauer (9 February 1919 – 17 June 1990) was a Luftwaffe fighter pilot during World War II and a recipient of the Knight's Cross of the Iron Cross.  Bauer claimed 57 aerial victories, 39 over the Western Front and 18 over the Eastern Front.

Bauer claimed his first of 18 victories over the Eastern Front on 20 March 1943.  In 1944 he was transferred to the Western Front where he claimed another 39 victories. He was awarded the Knight's Cross of the Iron Cross on 31 October 1944 after his 34th victory.  After the war he joined the new Luftwaffe and retired as a Hauptmann in 1960.

With Jagdgeschwader 300
In June 1944, Bauer was posted to II. Sturmgruppe (2nd assault group) of Jagdgeschwader 300 "Wilde Sau" (JG 300—300th Fighter Wing). On 9 August, Bauer made a forced landing in his Focke Wulf Fw 190 A at Griesheim Airfield following combat with Boeing B-17 Flying Fortress bombers. Bauer was awarded the Knight's Cross of the Iron Cross on 31 October for 34 aerial victories.

Summary of career

Aerial victory claims
According to US historian David T. Zabecki, Bauer was credited with 57 aerial victories. Obermaier also lists Bauer with 57 aerial victory claims, 39 over the Western Front, including 32 four-engine bombers, and 18 over the Eastern Front. According to Weal, he was credited with 68 aerial victories. Mathews and Foreman, authors of Luftwaffe Aces — Biographies and Victory Claims, researched the German Federal Archives and found documentation for 38 aerial victory claims, plus further ten unconfirmed claims. The number of confirmed claims includes 16 on the Eastern Front and 22 on the Western Front, including 13 four-engine bombers.

Victory claims were logged to a map-reference (PQ = Planquadrat), for example "PQ 35 Ost 25281". These sectors were then subdivided into 36 smaller units to give a location area 3 × 4 km in size.

Awards
 Honor Goblet of the Luftwaffe on 8 May 1944 as Feldwebel and pilot
 German Cross in Gold on 10 July 1944 as Feldwebel in the 5./Jagdgeschwader 300
 Knight's Cross of the Iron Cross on 31 October 1944 as Feldwebel and pilot in the 5./Jagdgeschwader 300

Notes

References

Citations

Bibliography

 
 
 
 
 
 
 
 
 
 
 
 
 
 
 

1919 births
1990 deaths
Luftwaffe pilots
German World War II flying aces
Recipients of the Gold German Cross
Recipients of the Knight's Cross of the Iron Cross
German Air Force personnel
Military personnel from Gelsenkirchen